Seidu Olawale (born 12 April 1962) is a Nigerian wrestler. He competed in the men's freestyle 74 kg at the 1984 Summer Olympics.

References

1962 births
Living people
Nigerian male sport wrestlers
Olympic wrestlers of Nigeria
Wrestlers at the 1984 Summer Olympics
Place of birth missing (living people)
20th-century Nigerian people